Richard Cortright (October 13, 1929 – September 4, 2009) was an American cyclist. He competed at the 1952, 1956 and 1960 Summer Olympics.

References

External links
 

1929 births
2009 deaths
American male cyclists
Olympic cyclists of the United States
Cyclists at the 1952 Summer Olympics
Cyclists at the 1956 Summer Olympics
Cyclists at the 1960 Summer Olympics
Sportspeople from Buffalo, New York
Pan American Games medalists in cycling
Pan American Games gold medalists for the United States
American track cyclists
Competitors at the 1959 Pan American Games
Medalists at the 1959 Pan American Games